This is a list of notable architects from the Czech Republic.

A–M

Jakub Auguston
František Bílek
Heinrich Blum
Josef Chochol
Kilián Ignác Dientzenhofer
Kryštof Dientzenhofer
DRNH architects
Alois Dryák
Otto Eisler
Karl Ernstberger
Josef Fanta
Bedřich Feuerstein
Daniela Filipiová
Zdeněk Fránek
Bohuslav Fuchs
František Lydie Gahura
Jiri Lev
Jiří Löw
Josef Gočár
Josef Hlávka
Josef Hoffmann
Vlastislav Hofman
Jan Vladimír Hráský
Karel Hubáček
Pavel Janák
Eva Jiřičná
František Maxmilián Kaňka
Jan Kaplický

Jan Kotěra

Jaromír Krejcar
Jiří Kroha

Kuba & Pilař architects

Jan Letzel
Evžen Linhart
Adolf Loos

Vlado Milunić
Josef Mocker

N–Z

Milada Petříková-Pavlíková
Anton Pilgram
Osvald Polívka
Antonín Raymond
Matěj Rejsek
Benedikt Rejt
Jan Blažej Santini-Aichel
Svatopluk Sládeček
Markéta Veselá
Rudolf Wels
Josef Zítek

See also

 List of architects
 List of Czechs

Czech
Architects